

N05A Antipsychotics

N05AA Phenothiazines with aliphatic side-chain
N05AA01 Chlorpromazine
N05AA02 Levomepromazine
N05AA03 Promazine
N05AA04 Acepromazine
N05AA05 Triflupromazine
N05AA06 Cyamemazine
N05AA07 Chlorproethazine

N05AB Phenothiazines with piperazine structure
N05AB01 Dixyrazine
N05AB02 Fluphenazine
N05AB03 Perphenazine
N05AB04 Prochlorperazine
N05AB05 Thiopropazate
N05AB06 Trifluoperazine
N05AB07 Acetophenazine
N05AB08 Thioproperazine
N05AB09 Butaperazine
N05AB10 Perazine

N05AC Phenothiazines with piperidine structure
N05AC01 Periciazine
N05AC02 Thioridazine
N05AC03 Mesoridazine
N05AC04 Pipotiazine

N05AD Butyrophenone derivatives
N05AD01 Haloperidol
N05AD02 Trifluperidol
N05AD03 Melperone
N05AD04 Moperone
N05AD05 Pipamperone
N05AD06 Bromperidol
N05AD07 Benperidol
N05AD08 Droperidol
N05AD09 Fluanisone
N05AD10 Lumateperone
QN05AD90 Azaperone

N05AE Indole derivatives
N05AE01 Oxypertine
N05AE02 Molindone
N05AE03 Sertindole
N05AE04 Ziprasidone
N05AE05 Lurasidone

N05AF Thioxanthene derivatives
N05AF01 Flupentixol
N05AF02 Clopenthixol
N05AF03 Chlorprothixene
N05AF04 Thiothixene
N05AF05 Zuclopenthixol

N05AG Diphenylbutylpiperidine derivatives
N05AG01 Fluspirilene
N05AG02 Pimozide
N05AG03 Penfluridol

N05AH Diazepines, oxazepines, thiazepines and oxepines
N05AH01 Loxapine
N05AH02 Clozapine
N05AH03 Olanzapine
N05AH04 Quetiapine
N05AH05 Asenapine
N05AH06 Clotiapine
N05AH53 Olanzapine and samidorphan

C07FX Beta blocking agents, other combinations

N05AL Benzamides
N05AL01 Sulpiride
N05AL02 Sultopride
N05AL03 Tiapride
N05AL04 Remoxipride
N05AL05 Amisulpride
N05AL06 Veralipride
N05AL07 Levosulpiride

N05AN Lithium
N05AN01 Lithium

N05AX Other antipsychotics
N05AX07 Prothipendyl
N05AX08 Risperidone
N05AX10 Mosapramine
N05AX11 Zotepine
N05AX12 Aripiprazole
N05AX13 Paliperidone
N05AX14 Iloperidone
N05AX15 Cariprazine
N05AX16 Brexpiprazole
N05AX17 Pimavanserin
QN05AX90 Amperozide

N05B Anxiolytics

N05BA Benzodiazepine derivatives
N05BA01 Diazepam
N05BA02 Chlordiazepoxide
N05BA03 Medazepam
N05BA04 Oxazepam
N05BA05 Potassium clorazepate
N05BA06 Lorazepam
N05BA07 Adinazolam
N05BA08 Bromazepam
N05BA09 Clobazam
N05BA10 Ketazolam
N05BA11 Prazepam
N05BA12 Alprazolam
N05BA13 Halazepam
N05BA14 Pinazepam
N05BA15 Camazepam
N05BA16 Nordazepam
N05BA17 Fludiazepam
N05BA18 Ethyl loflazepate
N05BA19 Etizolam
N05BA21 Clotiazepam
N05BA22 Cloxazolam
N05BA23 Tofisopam
N05BA24 Bentazepam
N05BA25 Mexazolam
N05BA56 Lorazepam, combinations

N05BB Diphenylmethane derivatives
N05BB01 Hydroxyzine
N05BB02 Captodiame
N05BB51 Hydroxyzine, combinations

N05BC Carbamates
N05BC01 Meprobamate
N05BC03 Emylcamate
N05BC04 Mebutamate
N05BC51 Meprobamate, combinations

N05BD Dibenzo-bicyclo-octadiene derivatives
N05BD01 Benzoctamine

N05BE Azaspirodecanedione derivatives
N05BE01 Buspirone

N05BX Other anxiolytics
N05BX01 Mephenoxalone
N05BX02 Gedocarnil
N05BX03 Etifoxine
N05BX04 Fabomotizole
N05BX05 Lavandulae aetheroleum

N05C Hypnotics and sedatives

N05CA Barbiturates, plain
N05CA01 Pentobarbital
N05CA02 Amobarbital
N05CA03 Butobarbital
N05CA04 Barbital
N05CA05 Aprobarbital
N05CA06 Secobarbital
N05CA07 Talbutal
N05CA08 Vinylbital
N05CA09 Vinbarbital
N05CA10 Cyclobarbital
N05CA11 Heptabarbital
N05CA12 Reposal
N05CA15 Methohexital
N05CA16 Hexobarbital
N05CA19 Thiopental
N05CA20 Ethallobarbital
N05CA21 Allobarbital
N05CA22 Proxibarbal

N05CB Barbiturates, combinations
N05CB01 Combinations of barbiturates
N05CB02 Barbiturates in combination with other drugs

N05CC Aldehydes and derivatives
N05CC01 Chloral hydrate
N05CC02 Chloralodol
N05CC03 Acetylglycinamide chloral hydrate
N05CC04 Dichloralphenazone
N05CC05 Paraldehyde

N05CD Benzodiazepine derivatives
N05CD01 Flurazepam
N05CD02 Nitrazepam
N05CD03 Flunitrazepam
N05CD04 Estazolam
N05CD05 Triazolam
N05CD06 Lormetazepam
N05CD07 Temazepam
N05CD08 Midazolam
N05CD09 Brotizolam
N05CD10 Quazepam
N05CD11 Loprazolam
N05CD12 Doxefazepam
N05CD13 Cinolazepam
N05CD14 Remimazolam
N05CD15 Nimetazepam

QN05CD90 Climazolam

N05CE Piperidinedione derivatives
N05CE01 Glutethimide
N05CE02 Methyprylon
N05CE03 Pyrithyldione

N05CF Benzodiazepine related drugs
N05CF01 Zopiclone
N05CF02 Zolpidem
N05CF03 Zaleplon
N05CF04 Eszopiclone

N05CH Melatonin receptor agonists
N05CH01 Melatonin
N05CH02 Ramelteon
N05CH03 Tasimelteon

N05CM Other hypnotics and sedatives
N05CM01 Methaqualone
N05CM02 Clomethiazole
N05CM03 Bromisoval
N05CM04 Carbromal
N05CM05 Scopolamine
N05CM06 Propiomazine
N05CM07 Triclofos
N05CM08 Ethchlorvynol
N05CM09 Valerianae radix
N05CM10 Hexapropymate
N05CM11 Bromides
N05CM12 Apronal
N05CM13 Valnoctamide
N05CM15 Methylpentynol
N05CM16 Niaprazine
N05CM18 Dexmedetomidine
N05CM19 Suvorexant
N05CM21 Lemborexant
QN05CM90 Detomidine
QN05CM91 Medetomidine
QN05CM92 Xylazine
QN05CM93 Romifidine
QN05CM94 Metomidate
QN05CM96 Tasipimidine
QN05CM99 Combinations

N05CX Hypnotics and sedatives in combination, excluding barbiturates
N05CX01 Meprobamate, combinations
N05CX02 Methaqualone, combinations
N05CX03 Methylpentynol, combinations
N05CX04 Clomethiazole, combinations
N05CX05 Emepronium, combinations
N05CX06 Dipiperonylaminoethanol, combinations

References

N05